James Yeadon (10 December 1861 – 30 May 1914) was an English first-class cricketer, who played three times for Yorkshire County Cricket Club in 1888.

Born in Yeadon, near Leeds, Yorkshire, England, Yeadon was a right-handed batsman, and a wicket-keeper, who scored forty one runs in six innings with the bat, at an average of 10.25, with a high score of 22. He took five catches and made three stumpings.

Yeadon died in his home town of Yeadon in May 1914, aged 52.

References

1861 births
1914 deaths
People from Yeadon, West Yorkshire
English cricketers
Yorkshire cricketers
Cricketers from Yorkshire